Baglini is a surname. Notable people with the surname include:

Maurizio Baglini (born 1975), Italian pianist
Raúl Baglini (1949–2021), Argentine politician

See also
Baggini